Diocese of Thiruvananthapuram may refer to:

 Thiruvananthapuram Orthodox Diocese
 Roman Catholic Archdiocese of Trivandrum
 Syro-Malankara Catholic Major Archeparchy of Trivandrum